Goat Paddock is a 5 km-diameter near-circular bowl-shaped depression in a range of gently dipping Proterozoic sandstone in  the Kimberley Region of northern Western Australia, 106 km west-southwest of Halls Creek. It is interpreted  as an ancient meteorite impact crater, the evidence including breccia containing melted rocks, silica glass, shatter cones and shocked quartz. Drilling shows that the crater is filled with about 200 m of ancient lake sediments containing Early Eocene pollen, this age thus giving a minimum estimate for the age of the crater itself. The crater is not perfectly circular, but slightly elongated in a north–south direction, suggesting that the projectile struck at low angle from either the north or south.

References

Further reading 
 Milton, D. J., Ferguson, J. and Fudali,R.F., Goat Paddock impact crater, Western Australia (abstract). Meteoritics, v. 15, p. 333. 1980

Impact craters of Western Australia
Eocene impact craters
Eocene Australia